Bodi District is one of the nine districts in Western North Region, Ghana. Originally it was formerly part of the then-larger Juaboso-Bodi District in August 2004, until the southeast part of the district was split off to create Bodi District on 28 June 2012; thus the remaining part has been renamed as Juaboso District. The district assembly is located in the northwest part of Western North Region and has Bodi as its capital town.

References

Districts of the Western North Region